The 2012–13 Pacific Tigers men's basketball team represented the University of the Pacific during the 2012–13 NCAA Division I men's basketball season. The Tigers, led by 25th year head coach Bob Thomason, played their home games at Alex G. Spanos Center and were members of the Big West Conference. They finished the season 22–13, 13–5 in Big West play to finish in second place. They were champions of the Big West tournament, winning the championship game over UC Irvine, to earn an automatic bid to the 2013 NCAA tournament where they lost in the first round to Miami (FL).

Before the season, Bob Thomason announced that he would retire at the end of the season. This was also Pacific's final year in the Big West. In July 2013, they rejoined the West Coast Conference. The Tigers were charter members of the WCC in 1952 and left the conference in 1971.

Roster

Schedule

|-
!colspan=9| France Tour

|-
!colspan=9| Exhibition

|-
!colspan=9| Regular season

|-
!colspan=9| 2013 Big West Conference men's basketball tournament

|-
!colspan=9|2013 NCAA tournament

References

Pacific Tigers men's basketball seasons
Pacific
Pacific